Mary Free Bed Rehabilitation Hospital is a 167-bed acute care inpatient rehabilitation hospital for children and adults who have experienced a brain injury, spinal cord injury, stroke, amputation, or other injury or illness requiring physical rehabilitation.

Located in Grand Rapids, Michigan, the not-for-profit hospital expanded from 80 beds to 167 beds in early 2015. Patients come from throughout the Midwest and beyond to recover movement and function through Mary Free Bed's inpatient rehabilitation programs.

In 2014, Mary Free Bed and the Michigan State University College of Human Medicine created a partnership to expand Mary Free Bed into a teaching and research hospital. The John F. Butzer Center for Research & Innovation is led by John F. Butzer, MD, who served as Mary Free Bed's chief medical officer for 29 years. MSUCHM also launched the Division of Rehabilitation Medicine in 2014 and named Dr. Butzer as director.

History 

The story of Mary Free Bed began in 1891 when a small group of women wanted to help people who couldn't afford health care. They passed a purse and asked anyone named Mary – or anyone who knew someone named Mary – to donate a dime. It was the most common name at the time, and the donations supported the first “Mary free bed” at a local hospital.

Rehabilitation services 

Sports
The hospital's Wheelchair & Adaptive Sports Program sponsors junior and adult teams, including the Grand Rapids Pacers wheelchair basketball team, Mary Free Bed Sonics goalball team, Grand Rapids Rollin’ Whitecaps wheelchair softball team, Grand Rapids Sled Wings sled hockey team, Grand Rapids Thunder quad rugby team, and tennis teams. Mary Free Bed supports handcycle and wheelchair racing teams and sponsors the 25K wheelchair and handcycle divisions of the Fifth Third River Bank Run held annually in downtown Grand Rapids. The program also hosts adaptive clinics for recreational activities like yoga, archery, rock climbing, golfing, sailing, kayaking, water-skiing, scuba diving, and snow-skiing.

  
Accreditation
Mary Free Bed Rehabilitation Hospital is accredited by the Joint Commission on Accreditation of Healthcare Organizations. Programs accredited by the international Commission on Accreditation of Rehabilitation Facilities include brain injury, spinal cord injury, stroke, amputation, and pediatrics.
 
The Mary Free Bed Rehabilitation Network
The Mary Free Bed Rehabilitation Network was launched in June 2011 to provide better access to Mary Free Bed doctors, staff, and education. This group of healthcare organizations works together to provide coordinated, collaborative care after a serious injury or illness. Members include Allegiance Health, Borgess Hospital, Bronson Battle Creek, Bronson LakeView, Bronson Methodist, McLaren Health System, Metro Health Hospital, and Sparrow Hospital.

References

Further reading 
 Michigan Hospitals Launch Healthy Food Initiatives to Improve Population Health
 Healthy-food Initiatives Reflect Hospitals' Changing Mission

External links
 Mary Free Bed Rehabilitation Hospital

Hospitals in Michigan
Hospitals established in 1891
Rehabilitation hospitals